Benedict Louis Stabile (December 13, 1927 – July 28, 2014) was a vice admiral in the United States Coast Guard who served as Vice Commandant from 1982 to 1986. He was married to Barbara Adele Thompson and has four children. He was born in Brooklyn, New York and graduated from the United States Coast Guard Academy in 1950. He later also attended Massachusetts Institute of Technology, attaining a degree in Naval Engineering. Stabile also served at a point as Chief of Coast Guard Engineering. Upon his retirement from the Coast Guard in 1986, he served as the president of the Webb Institute until 1990. On July 28, 2014, Stabile died at the age of 86.

References

2014 deaths
United States Coast Guard admirals
Vice Commandants of the United States Coast Guard
1927 births